Rivington Place is a purpose-built international visual arts centre in Shoreditch, London.

Origins and history
Rivington Place was commissioned by two publicly funded visual arts organisations, Iniva and Autograph ABP, with the intention of establishing the new venue as a major international visual arts centre in Shoreditch, London. In the late 20th century, this part of the East End emerged as a new arts quarter, famous for harbouring the YBA movement, with leading private galleries such as White Cube in nearby Hoxton Square. Both Iniva and Autograph were founded to reflect and promote cultural diversity in the visual arts, and it was hoped that the new building would advance this aim.
The five-storey building was designed by leading architect David Adjaye and opened to the public on 5 October 2007. It cost £8 million to complete and was the first publicly funded new-build international art gallery in London since the Hayward Gallery opened more than 40 years earlier.

Function and activities
Primarily a free public gallery, for most of the year, the two exhibition spaces are used to show contemporary visual art shows. With  of space, the venue also houses education facilities and seminar rooms as well as the offices Autograph.

Significant exhibitions
Featuring in the programme of exhibitions held in the building  have been shows by Ghanaian photojournalist James Barnor, British sculptor Hew Locke, French film maker Zineb Sedira and Nigerian/British fine-art photographer Rotimi Fani-Kayode.

References

External links
Official website for Autograph
Official website for Iniva

Arts centres in London
Contemporary art galleries in London
Buildings and structures in the London Borough of Hackney
Tourist attractions in the London Borough of Hackney
Art galleries established in 2007
Shoreditch
2007 establishments in England